Bulging Lake is a lake in the Unorganized Part of Kenora District in Northwestern Ontario, Canada. It is in the Hudson Bay drainage basin and within Woodland Caribou Provincial Park.

The primary inflow, at the southwest, and outflow, at the northwest, is the Haggart River. The Haggart River flows via Carroll Lake, the Gammon River, the Bloodvein River, Lake Winnipeg, and the Nelson River to Hudson Bay.

See also
List of lakes in Ontario

References

Lakes of Kenora District